Sean Price (March 17, 1972 – August 8, 2015), also formerly known as Ruck, was an American hip hop recording artist from Brownsville, Brooklyn. His discography consists of fourteen studio albums, including four solo albums, one collaborative album with Black Milk & Guilty Simpson, one collaborative album with Small Professor, one collaborative album with Lil' Fame, three albums as half of duo Heltah Skeltah, four albums as member of supergroup Boot Camp Clik, as well as two collaborative extended plays (one with M-Phazes and one with Illa Ghee), four official mixtapes, two box sets, one video album, numerous singles, and many guest appearances on other artists' songs.

Studio albums

Extended plays

Official mixtapes

Bootlegs

Box sets

Video albums

Group albums

Heltah Skeltah

Boot Camp Clik

Singles

Guest appearances

References

External links

Discographies of American artists
Hip hop discographies
Sean Price albums